Smt N.P. Durga, a politician from Telugu Desam Party, is a Member of the Parliament of India representing Andhra Pradesh in the Rajya Sabha, the upper house of the Parliament.

External links
 Profile on Rajya Sabha website

Living people
Telugu Desam Party politicians
Rajya Sabha members from Andhra Pradesh
Place of birth missing (living people)
Year of birth missing (living people)